P. N. Rangan (1951– 8 November 2011, known by his pen name Manu) was an Indian scientist and Kannadiga author.

Career
Manu wrote more than 9 books in 9 publications in Kannada, Telugu and English languages.

Bibliography

Awards

See also

List of people from Karnataka

References

Citations

External links
 

1946 births
Writers from Mysore
Kannada people
20th-century Indian male writers
2011 deaths